The tornado outbreak of April 9–11, 2009 was a tornado outbreak that affected large portions of the Southern United States on April 9–11, 2009. At least 5 people were killed by tornadoes including three in Mena, Arkansas and two in Murfreesboro, Tennessee just south of Nashville. A total of 85 tornadoes were confirmed over the two days. Three people were killed in Texas due to wildfires caused by strong winds stemming from the same storm system. This event is sometimes referred to as the Good Friday tornado outbreak of 2009.

Meteorological synopsis
A storm system over the southern Great Plains region resulted in severe weather development during the late afternoon and evening along a dry line that stretched from southern Kansas across northeastern Oklahoma into southwestern Missouri and northwest Arkansas. As a result, a moderate risk of severe weather was issued by the Storm Prediction Center for eastern Oklahoma, southeast Kansas, southwest Missouri and western Arkansas. The system approached as the atmosphere destabilized as a result of daytime heating. Thunderstorms began developmenting along a dry line in Oklahoma between 2 and 3 pm CDT (1900 and 2000 UTC). More thunderstorms started forming as they approached into western Arkansas, and encountered a strong wind field around the incoming system. Winds began turning with height, which caused some thunderstorms to rotate and spawn tornadoes. Beginning at 6:20 CDT (2320 UTC), several tornadoes were produced in eastern sections of Oklahoma and Texas. The severe weather then moved into Arkansas, where a tornado killed three people in Mena. The thunderstorms that affected Texas then went into Louisiana, creating numerous tornadoes in the state, one of which tracked through downtown Shreveport.

On April 10 (Good Friday), the storm system moved east into the Tennessee Valley and eventually into the Carolinas during the night. Ahead of the storm, warm and moist air quickly moved northeast into Alabama, Georgia, eastern sections of Tennessee and parts of the Carolinas. A separate band of strong jet stream winds went east across Mississippi and Alabama. The strengthening winds and increased moisture helped create conditions favorable for the development of supercells that could produce strong tornadoes. The Storm Prediction Center issued a moderate risk of severe weather for sections of the Tennessee Valley, Gulf Coast states and into the southern Appalachians region. As the system moved across the lower Ohio Valley area around the noon hour, a line of thunderstorms started to produce tornadoes in parts of Kentucky and Tennessee. One of the tornadoes that struck Tennessee early that afternoon killed two people in Murfreesboro. Portions of the moderate risk area in northeastern Alabama, northwestern Georgia and southeastern Tennessee were upgraded to a high risk at 1:44 pm CDT (1844 UTC).

The thunderstorms moved southeast across much of South Carolina, Georgia and Alabama later that afternoon and into the evening. They produced tornadoes in northeastern sections of Alabama, damaging homes in Langston and Powell. Further south, tornadoes damaged areas in central Alabama, one of which tracked through three counties and into the Montgomery metropolitan area. One area of thunderstorms that evening produced a long-tracked tornado that moved from Grovetown, Georgia, through Augusta and ended in Ellenton, South Carolina. The tornado moved across Augusta but missed the Augusta National Golf Club where the Masters Tournament was taking place during the weekend. The storm system reached the Atlantic Coast during the early morning hours of April 11, producing one tornado in North Carolina.

Confirmed tornadoes

April 9 event

April 10 event

April 11 event

Mena, Arkansas

At 7:24 p.m. CDT (0024 UTC) on April 9, a tornado warning was issued for areas north of Mena in Polk County, Arkansas, and at 8:01 p.m. CDT (0101 UTC) the warning extended into the city. A tornado touched down one minute later a few miles southwest of Mena and travelled north of Highway 59/71 into the western part of town. Three people were killed, thirty people were injured, and 600 homes were either damaged or destroyed in Mena. One death was caused after the roof inside a Masonic Lodge lounge collapsed on the victim. The other two victims were killed after the tornado hit their homes. The Polk County Jail was severely damaged to the point that minor offense prisoners were released, with serious offenders taken to jails around the area. The Polk County Courthouse received damage after a radio antenna fell over onto part of the building, damaging the roof. The Mena Regional Health System also sustained damage, but continued to treat patients and ran off auxiliary power. Mena City Hall, the police station, and the fire department were all damaged as well. The high winds from the tornado threw a bus into a tree. The roof at the Mena Middle School was significantly damaged, with part of the gymnasium roof ripped off and a portable classroom was destroyed. The damage to the middle school was so severe that it had to be condemned. The tornado also heavily impacted Rich Mountain Community College and destroyed two businesses at the city's industrial park. The tornado that hit Mena was rated EF3 by the National Weather Service in Little Rock, Arkansas.

As the tornado moved northeast of town, it destroyed a tractor dealership and heavily impacted many homes and farms. The tornado continued through rural areas until lifting northeast of Ink at 8:17 p.m. CDT (0117 UTC). In total in the county, 165 houses were destroyed, 701 more houses sustained major damage, and more than 11,000 trees were downed along the path.

Murfreesboro, Tennessee

At 11:00 a.m. CDT (1645 UTC). At 12:19 p.m. CDT (1719 UTC), a tornado touched down in extreme southwestern Rutherford County, Tennessee just north of Eagleville. By 12:45 pm CDT (1745 UTC), the tornado had struck Murfreesboro with devastating results as two people were killed. The two victims were a mother and her 9-week-old daughter who were taking shelter inside their home when the tornado hit. Fifty-eight people were injured by the tornado. A total of 845 homes sustained damage from the tornado, of which 117 were destroyed, 298 had major damage, 175 suffered minor damage and 255 were directly affected.

During the tornado's  path, it moved to the northeast for most of its existence, then turned to the east-southeast before dissipating. Damage was extensive in the city as a two-story office building had the upper floor completely removed. Several vehicles were picked up and tossed, including numerous semi-trailer trucks. At one area, a two-story brick home was nearly destroyed with only part of a kitchen wall left standing. In another area, three homes were destroyed and thrown off their foundations, with one of the three homes not properly anchored and the other two very well constructed. The tornado was rated EF4 by the National Weather Service in Nashville, Tennessee. It was the 28th tornado to hit Rutherford County since the National Weather Service began keeping records in 1950 and the first killer tornado to hit the county during that period.

In response to this event the Rutherford County Home Builders Association and its Certified Professional Builder Program have coordinated a Disaster Response Team. The volunteers were trained by Emergency Management Services to help first responders at disaster sites with the necessary heavy equipment to aide in relief work.

Non-tornadic events
During the passage of the dry line and cold front, very strong winds in central Oklahoma and northern Texas occurred behind the severe weather. Wind gusts exceeded  while dew points were in the 20s °F (below -2 °C) behind the dry line with temperatures reaching into the 80s °F (upper 20s °C). The combination of hot and very dry air and very strong winds sparked numerous wildfires during the late afternoon hours. In Oklahoma, 62 people were injured by the wildfires. One hundred structures were destroyed in Oklahoma County, of which 12 homes in Midwest City and 58 homes in Choctaw were destroyed. Officials later confirmed that one of the wildfires in Midwest City was set deliberately. In South Carolina, one man was killed in a car accident after crashing into trees that had fallen into the roadway as severe weather created poor visibility.

Aftermath
The Governor of Arkansas Mike Beebe declared five counties in Arkansas disaster areas after the damage caused by the severe weather. Fifty soldiers from the National Guard helped with removing debris and providing security while 60 prisoners also helped with debris removal. The local Walmart was being used as a supply center as it was the only building with power. All Red Cross supplies were sent to the store and arrived on April 10. Two people from the Red Cross assisted victims of the tornado by providing tarps donated by a Lowe's store as well as flashlights and other supplies. Twelve others were sent to conduct damage assessments in Mena. A Southern Baptist Disaster Relief group cooked meals that would be served by the Salvation Army at three different locations. A mobile feeding operation provided meals for residents in De Queen, where a trailer park was destroyed by the inclement weather. On April 14, A group of 19 student-athletes and coaches from the University of Central Arkansas helped unload equipment that was moved from Mena Middle School to a middle school in Hatfield. As many as 300 seventh and eighth-graders were sent to the middle school in Hatfield, while 165 sixth-graders went to a Baptist church to complete the school year.

The Governor of Tennessee Phil Bredesen, United States Senators Bob Corker and Lamar Alexander, United States Representative Bart Gordon and the mayors of Murfreesboro and Rutherford County each toured the tornado damage in Murfreesboro. Sixteen Nashville-area Lowe's stores served as donation sites for the Red Cross to assist people who have been affected by the tornado. Michael Waltrip Racing and Best Western aided victims by donating $7,500 and hotel rooms for those who were left homeless. Country singer Chris Young performed at Middle Tennessee State University for a tornado relief benefit. The Red Cross helped residents in Murfreesboro by serving nearly 15,000 meals and snacks, distributing nearly 4,000 cleanup and comfort kits, and provided counseling to more than 500 tornado victims and their families. The United Way set up the "United Way of Rutherford & Cannon Counties Long Term Recovery Fund" at a bank to accept donations for tornado victims. In South Carolina, Governor Mark Sanford made a visit to Aiken County to assess tornado damage. The Red Cross provided services and disaster relief to those affected in Aiken County such as tarps, food and beverages. A middle school was used as an emergency shelter, and The Salvation Army, Aiken County Emergency Management, Aiken County Sheriff's Office and Department of Social Services helped with the cleanup and removal of debris. In response to the wildfires, the Governor of Oklahoma Brad Henry declared a state of emergency for 31 counties.

See also
 Tornadoes of 2009
 Lists of United States tornadoes in 2009
 List of North American tornadoes and tornado outbreaks

References

External links
https://web.archive.org/web/20090426053025/http://www.realclearwx.com/menatornado.htm. Mena Tornado Pictures & Aerial Video
"Video: Tornado Hits Mena". KSFM.
Staff Writer (2009-04-09). "Timeline of April 9th Tornadoes". KSFM.
Severe Weather - "Apr. 10, 2009 (Photo Gallery)". WTVF.
Tornado Strikes Stones River National Battlefield Park – Photo article showing tornado damage to the battlefield park.

Tornadoes of 2009
F4 tornadoes by date
Murfreesboro, Tennessee
Tornadoes in Oklahoma
Tornadoes in Arkansas
Tornadoes in Tennessee
Tornadoes in Louisiana
Tornadoes in Georgia (U.S. state)
Tornadoes in South Carolina
Tornadoes in Alabama
Tornado outbreak